Lea Lin Teutenberg (born 2 July 1999) is a German professional racing cyclist, who currently rides for UCI Women's Continental Team . Her father is Lars Teutenberg, her uncle Sven Teutenberg and her aunt Ina-Yoko Teutenberg.

References

External links
 

1999 births
Living people
German female cyclists
People from Mettmann
Sportspeople from Düsseldorf (region)
Cyclists from North Rhine-Westphalia
21st-century German women